Vitisin B is a natural phenol found in red wines.  It is a pyranoanthocyanin.

See also 
 Phenolic compounds in wine
 Vitisin A (pyranoanthocyanin)

References 

Pyranoanthocyanins
Methoxy compounds